Penicillium humuli is an anamorph species of the genus of Penicillium.

References

Further reading
 
 

humuli
Fungi described in 1939